Golzower Busch is a forest in the south of the territory of Golzow in the county of Potsdam-Mittelmark in the German state of Brandenburg. It extends from the B 102 federal highway in the northwest, running towards the southeast for about four kilometres. Its maximum width is one kilometre.

External links 
 Golzower Busch

Forests and woodlands of Brandenburg
Potsdam-Mittelmark